The Phoenix Arizona Temple is a temple of the Church of Jesus Christ of Latter-day Saints (LDS Church), in the city of Phoenix, Arizona. It was completed in 2014 and is the 144th temple of the LDS Church. The announcement of the planned construction of the temple on May 24, 2008, came a month after the Gila Valley and Gilbert temples were announced for Arizona.

History
The announcement to build a temple in Phoenix came in part as a response to the high concentration of church members in the area and to help ease the load on the nearby Mesa Arizona Temple.

The original design of the temple, which resembled the Draper Utah Temple in design, exceeded the maximum height restrictions imposed by existing zoning law and required an exception be granted by the Phoenix city council. The exterior color of the temple was also changed from the traditional white to a more natural stone color in an effort to address the concerns of residents in the neighborhood.

The city council voted to approve the requested zoning exemptions on December 2, 2009. Local residents opposed to the construction mounted a successful campaign to call for a voter referendum on the council's decision, delivering the requisite signatures by December 31, potentially delaying the approval process until September 2011 when the issue could be put to a vote. LDS Church representatives indicated that the redesign process would take between eight months and a year. The height of the steeple, building color and lighting are not regulated by zoning laws and it was unclear at that time if the steeple height would be changed with the redesign, or previous design concessions would be retained in the new design.

On August 17, 2010, the redesign was submitted to the city of Phoenix for preliminary approval. A meeting for neighbors of the temple was held that same day. The redesigned structure is 30 feet high with a 90-foot spire. This met the 30-feet zoning limit on building heights, and the total height is 9 feet lower than the previously proposed design.

Ronald A. Rasband, then of the Presidency of the Seventy, presided at a small groundbreaking ceremony held on June 4, 2011. A public open house was held from October 10 to November 1, 2014. The temple was formally dedicated on November 16, 2014, by Thomas S. Monson, and ended up being the last one he dedicated before his death.

In 2020, the Phoenix Arizona Temple was closed in response to the coronavirus pandemic.

See also

 Comparison of temples of The Church of Jesus Christ of Latter-day Saints
 List of temples of The Church of Jesus Christ of Latter-day Saints
 List of temples of The Church of Jesus Christ of Latter-day Saints by geographic region
 Temple architecture (Latter-day Saints)
 The Church of Jesus Christ of Latter-day Saints in Arizona

References

External links

Phoenix Arizona Temple Official site
Phoenix Arizona Temple at ChurchofJesusChristTemples.org

21st-century Latter Day Saint temples
Buildings and structures in Phoenix, Arizona
Temples (LDS Church) in Arizona
2014 establishments in Arizona
2014 in Christianity
Religious buildings and structures completed in 2014